Home Is the Essence of Christmas is the ninth studio album by American R&B singer Joe, released on November 2, 2010. The album features 10 songs, including album Make Sure You're Home for Christmass six songs and two Joe originals ("It Ain't Christmas", "Make Sure You're Home"). It was recorded and mixed by veteran producer/engineer Gene Lennon in Joshua Thompson’s studios in New Jersey.

Track

References

Joe (singer) albums
2010 Christmas albums
Christmas albums by American artists
Contemporary R&B Christmas albums